Satya Harishchandra is a 2017 Indian Kannada language romantic comedy film written and directed by Dayal Padmanabhan. It is produced by K. Manju under his K. Manju Cinemaas banner. It features Sharan, Sanchita Padukone and Bhavana Rao. The score and soundtrack for the film is by Arjun Janya and the cinematography is by Faisal Ali. The film was launched officially on 18 September 2016 and the filming took place at Mysore, Melukote and Germany. The film released on 20 October 2017 during the Diwali festival.

The film is an official remake of the 2013 Punjabi film Singh vs Kaur , the first Punjabi film to be remade in Kannada.

Cast
 Sharan as Satya Harishchandra
 Sanchita Padukone as Saanvi
 Bhavana Rao as Jayalakshmi
 Chikkanna
 Sharath Lohitashwa as Patel
 Seetha
 Vidyullekha Raman
 Valerian Menezes

Soundtrack

The film's score and soundtrack was composed by Arjun Janya. The audio was released online on 13 April 2017 and the music rights were acquired by Lahari Music. The soundtrack consists of four songs written by Yogaraj Bhat, Kaviraj and V. Nagendra Prasad. The popular folk song "Kuladalli Keelyavudo" from the Rajkumar starrer film Satya Harishchandra (1965) was reused in the soundtrack by adding the modern sound techniques. The song was shot in Melukote and Imran Sardhariya was roped in to choreograph the song.

References

External links
 

2017 films
2010s Kannada-language films
Indian romantic comedy films
Films scored by Arjun Janya
Films shot in Portugal
Kannada remakes of Punjabi films
2017 romantic comedy films
Films directed by Dayal Padmanabhan